Andrey Anatolyevich Shcharbakow ((Andrey Scherbakov); 31 January 1991 – 17 December 2018) was a Belarusian professional footballer.

On 17 December 2018 he died in a car accident.

Honours
BATE Borisov
Belarusian Premier League champion: 2011
Belarusian Super Cup winner: 2011

External links

References

1991 births
2018 deaths
Road incident deaths in Belarus
Belarusian footballers
Association football goalkeepers
Olympic footballers of Belarus
Footballers at the 2012 Summer Olympics
FC Vitebsk players
FC BATE Borisov players
FC Slutsk players
FC Belshina Bobruisk players
Sportspeople from Vitebsk